"Make It with You" is a song written by David Gates and originally recorded by American pop-rock group Bread, of which Gates was a member. Gates and drummer Mike Botts are the only members of the group to appear on the recording which was a No.1 hit.

Release
The song first appeared on Bread's 1970 album, On the Waters. Released as a single that June, it was the group's first top-ten hit on the Billboard Hot 100 singles chart and spent the week of August 22, 1970, at No.1, their only single to do so; it also reached No.5 on the UK Singles Chart. Billboard ranked "Make It with You" as the No. 13 song of 1970, and it was certified gold by the RIAA for sales of over one million copies.

Personnel
 David Gates - lead & harmony vocals, acoustic guitar, electric guitar, bass, strings
 Mike Botts - drums

Charts

Weekly charts

Year-end charts

Certifications

Notable cover versions

Many artists have recorded cover versions of "Make It with You." Among the most notable are: 
Ralfi Pagan's Latin-soul version reached No. 32 on the Billboard R&B chart in the summer of 1971. Later on, this version was featured on the seventh East Side Story compilation. 
Let Loose took their version to No. 7 in the UK charts in 1996. It was their third and last top ten hit.

See also
List of Hot 100 number-one singles of 1970 (U.S.)

References

External links
 

1970 singles
1970 songs
Bread (band) songs
Billboard Hot 100 number-one singles
Cashbox number-one singles
Songs written by David Gates
Andy Williams songs
Nancy Wilson (jazz singer) songs
Teddy Pendergrass songs
Elektra Records singles